The 2021–22 Oregon Ducks men's basketball team represented the University of Oregon during the 2021–22 NCAA Division I men's basketball season. The Ducks, led by 12th-year head coach Dana Altman, played their home games at Matthew Knight Arena as members of the Pac–12 Conference.

Previous season

The Ducks finished the season 21–7, 14–4 in Pac-12 play to win the regular season Pac-12 championship. They defeated Arizona State in the quarterfinals of the Pac-12 tournament before losing to their rival Oregon State in the semifinals. They were invited in the NCAA Tournament as a at-large bid where they moved on because VCU had Coronavirus. They beat Iowa in the second round before losing to PAC-12 member USC in the Sweet Sixteen.

Off-season

Departures
Note that all players in the 2020–21 season, regardless of their classification, had the option to return to the program. Due to COVID-19 impacts, the NCAA declared that the 2020–21 season would not count against the athletic eligibility of any student-athlete in any of the organization's winter sports, including basketball. This led the NBA and its players union to agree that for the 2021 draft only, players who were seniors in 2020–21 had to declare their eligibility for the draft.

Incoming transfers

2021 recruiting class

2022 recruiting class

Roster

Schedule and results

|-
!colspan=12 style=| Regular season

|-
!colspan=12 style=| Pac-12 tournament

|-
!colspan=12 style=| NIT

Player statistics

Awards & milestones

Season highs

Players 
Points:
Rebounds:
Assists:
Steals:
Blocks:
Minutes:

Team 
Points:
Field Goals:
Field Goal Attempts:
3 Point Field Goals Made:
3 Point Field Goals Attempts:
Free Throws Made:
Free Throws Attempts:
Rebounds:
Assists:
Steals:
Blocked Shots:
Turnovers:
Fouls:

Weekly awards

Pac-12 Conference awards and honors

Ranking movement

*AP does not release post-NCAA Tournament rankings.
^Coaches did not release a Week 1 poll.

References

Oregon Ducks men's basketball seasons
Oregon
Oregon Ducks men's basketball
Oregon Ducks men's basketball
Oregon